Lingas may refer to:
 Linga, plural lingas, a symbol in Hinduism
 , a river in France, tributary of the Dourbie
 26210 Lingas, an asteroid
 Bjarne Lingås (1933–2011), Norwegian boxer

See also 
 Linga (disambiguation)